Guy of Enghien (French: Guy de Enghien; died 1376) was the lord of Argos and Nauplia from 1356 to 1377 as vassal of the Principality of Achaea and titular duke of Athens as Guy III. He was son of Walter III of Enghien and Isabella of Brienne.

He was married with Bonne of Foucherolles and his children were:

 Maria, who succeeded to her father in Argos and Nauplia.

References 
 

 

1376 deaths
Lords of Argos and Nauplia
14th-century French people